Starships is a 1980 game manual for Starfleet Wars published by Superior Models, Inc.

Contents
Starships is booklet that functions as an identification manual for the Superior Modules starship miniatures for the Starfleet Wars game.

Reception
William A. Barton reviewed Starships in The Space Gamer No. 43. Barton commented that "If you're really into the Starfleet Wars universe, you might find this manual a worthwhile buy for [the price]. Casual players - and those wishing to avoid arguments - might as well pass."

References

Miniature wargames